Robert Sample (died 1719, first name occasionally Richard, last name occasionally Semple) was a pirate active off the coast of Africa and in the Caribbean. He is best known for sailing with Edward England.

History

In late 1718 Edward England, aboard his ship Royal James (renamed from the recently captured Pearl) had been looting ships between Cape Verde and the Azores. He took a number of ships off Cape Coast Castle near Gambia in spring of 1719. Several he plundered and let go, a few he burned, but he refitted two for piracy. One of them was the 6-gun, 14-man Elizabeth and Katherine, commanded by Captain Bridge out of Barbados, which he captured on 27 June. Four of the Elizabeth and Katherine crew joined England's pirates. England refitted and crewed the Elizabeth and Katherine and renamed it Flying King, naming Richard Sample as captain.

Sample sailed with Robert Lane, who captained England’s other refitted vessel. They looted several ships in the Caribbean then stopped to careen their vessels. In November they sailed toward Brazil "and did a great deal of mischief" among Portuguese shipping. A Portuguese man-of-war ("a very unwelcome guest to them") chased them soon after. Lane escaped, but he and his crew died when their ship was lost offshore. Sample was unable to evade the warship and tried to escape by beaching the Flying King. Twelve of its crew had been killed; the Portuguese captured the rest, hanging 38, almost all of whom were English.

See also
Pirate Code, the "articles" signed by the Elizabeth and Katherine men when they joined England's pirate crew

References

Year of birth missing
18th-century pirates
British pirates
1719 deaths
Caribbean pirates